Jonas Kældsø Poulsen (born 21 March 1985) is a Danish former windsurfer, who specialized in the RS:X class. He represented his country Denmark at the 2008 Summer Olympics, finishing among the top twenty-five windsurfers in his signature sailboard. Poulsen trained as a member of Svendborg Sunds Sailing Club, under the tutelage of head coach Jacob Holst.

Poulsen competed for the Danish sailing squad in the inaugural men's RS:X class at the 2008 Summer Olympics in Beijing. Building up to his Olympic selection, he scored a commendable, twenty-ninth-place finish to claim one of the 26 berths offered at the 2007 ISAF Worlds in Cascais, Portugal. Poulsen stormed out from a poor start to a blistering top-four finish on the midway of the series. However, he struggled in the breezy conditions on the subsequent races that sent him tumbling down the leaderboard to a lowly twenty-fourth overall with 201 net points.

References

External links
 
 
 
 

1985 births
Living people
Danish male sailors (sport)
Danish windsurfers
Olympic sailors of Denmark
Sailors at the 2008 Summer Olympics – RS:X
People from Svendborg
Sportspeople from the Region of Southern Denmark